Litvinchuk derived from the word litvin, "a Lithuanian" from the Grand Duchy of Lithuania. It may refer to:

 Artur Litvinchuk (born 1988), Belarusian canoer
 Maryna Litvinchuk (born 1988), Ukrainian female hockey player
 Mihail Litvinchuk (born 1980), Belarusian footballer
 Petr Litvinchuk (born 1976), Belarusian sport shooter
 Zygmunt Apolinary Litwińczuk, Polish chancellor of the University of Life Sciences in Lublin

See also
 

Polish-language surnames
Belarusian-language surnames
Ukrainian-language surnames
Surnames of Lithuanian origin